Judy Junor (born July 27, 1948) is a Canadian provincial politician. Judy was a New Democratic Party (NDP) member of the Legislative Assembly of Saskatchewan for the constituency of Saskatoon Eastview.

Born in North Battleford, she grew up in Saskatoon and received a diploma from St. Paul's School of Nursing in 1969. She worked as a nurse in Saskatoon and served as president of the Saskatchewan Union of Nurses and as vice-president of the Saskatchewan Federation of Labour.

She was first elected to the legislature in a 1998 by-election following the resignation of Bob Pringle. Junor served in the provincial cabinet as associate minister of Health, as Provincial Secretary and as Minister of Learning.

She lost in the 2011 election to Corey Tochor of the Saskatchewan Party.

References

External links
 Judy Junor

1948 births
Living people
People from North Battleford
Politicians from Saskatoon
Saskatchewan New Democratic Party MLAs
Women MLAs in Saskatchewan
21st-century Canadian politicians
21st-century Canadian women politicians